The 1978 New South Wales state election was the first direct election for the Legislative Council since the council was reconstituted in 1856 and the creation of the Legislative Assembly. This was the result of the 1978 referendum which also reduced the number of members from 60 to 43 and that provided that members would serve for 3 terms of the Legislative Assembly. Under the transitional arrangements, 28 members had been indirectly elected by joint sittings of the New South Wales Parliament.

Results

Continuing Members 
28 members retained their seats in the council, with 14 of those members to retire at the next general election, held in 1981, and the remaining 14 members would retire at the following general election, held in 1984.

See also 
 Results of the 1978 New South Wales state election (Legislative Assembly)
 Candidates of the 1978 New South Wales state election
 Members of the New South Wales Legislative Council, 1978–1981

References 

1978 Legislative Council
New South Wales Legislative Council